The 1990 Spanish motorcycle Grand Prix was the third round of the 1990 Grand Prix motorcycle racing season. It took place on the weekend of 4–6 May 1990 at the Jerez circuit.

500 cc race report
Niall Mackenzie takes Kevin Magee’s seat (who was injured at the previous round), and Mick Doohan gets pole position.

Doohan gets crowded back at the first turn, with Wayne Rainey, Christian Sarron, Wayne Gardner, and Kevin Schwantz ahead of him.

The riders are getting strung out: Rainey, with a small gap to Gardner, a small gap to Schwantz, and a small gap to a group that gets smaller by Alex Barros crashing out of it.
Gardner catches and passes Rainey, and takes the win.

500 cc classification

References

Spanish motorcycle Grand Prix
Spanish
Motorcycle
Spanish motorcycle Grand Prix